Jouko Launonen (born 3 June 1939) is a Finnish speed skater. He competed at the 1964 Winter Olympics and the 1968 Winter Olympics.

References

1939 births
Living people
Finnish male speed skaters
Olympic speed skaters of Finland
Speed skaters at the 1964 Winter Olympics
Speed skaters at the 1968 Winter Olympics
Sportspeople from Jyväskylä
20th-century Finnish people